Saint Magdalen was a former town in Shelby Township, Ripley County, in the U.S. state of Indiana. The GNIS classifies it as a populated place.

History
A post office opened under the name Saint Magdalen in 1871, and remained in operation until 1905. The community was named after Mary Magdalene.

Geography

References

Unincorporated communities in Ripley County, Indiana
Ghost towns in Indiana
Unincorporated communities in Indiana